Udea costalis is a species of moth in the family Crambidae described by Eduard Friedrich Eversmann in 1852. It is found in Spain, France, Poland, Lithuania, Latvia, Russia, Kyrgyzstan and China.

References

Moths described in 1852
costalis
Moths of Europe